Paul Chaudet (born 17 November 1904, in Rivaz – 7 August 1977) was a Swiss politician.

He was elected to the Swiss Federal Council on 16 December 1954 and handed over office on 31 December 1966. He resigned on 28 November 1966 due to the Mirage-affair. He was affiliated with the Radical Party. During his time in office, he held the Military Department.

He was President of the Confederation twice in 1959 and 1962.

Owing to incompetent military advisors concerning the purchase of 100 Mirage fighter jets with a budget which increased by 66%, he was forced to resign in 1966 by his own Radical Party. 

With Jean-Pascal Delamuraz, he was one of the last Swiss Radicals. He remained, throughout his life, one of the rare right-wing Swiss politicians who was able to identify with both wine-growers and farmers.

The Radical Party has now fused with the right-wing Liberals.

External links

1904 births
1977 deaths
People from Lavaux-Oron District
Swiss Calvinist and Reformed Christians
Free Democratic Party of Switzerland politicians
Members of the Federal Council (Switzerland)
Members of the National Council (Switzerland)
Swiss military officers